Jensen is a suburb in the City of Townsville, Queensland, Australia. In the  Jensen had a population of 1,476 people.

Geography
Jensen is bounded by the Bruce Highway to the north and the Black River and Alice River to the west.

History 
The locality was officially named and bounded on 27 July 1991.

In the  Jensen had a population of 1,476 people.

Facilities 
Deeragun Police Station is at 3 Veales Road (corner of Bruce Highway).

Amenities 
Colonial Park is in Macquarie Street.

References

External links 

 

Suburbs of Townsville